The White Islands are a group of ice-covered islands extending north–south for about . They lie at the east margin of Swinburne Ice Shelf and near the terminus of Butler Glacier in the south part of Sulzberger Bay. This feature is rudely delineated on the map of the Byrd Antarctic Expedition, 1928–30, as "low ice cliffs" that rise above the level of the ice shelf. The islands were mapped in detail by United States Geological Survey (USGS) from surveys and U.S. Navy air photos, 1959–65. The name was applied by Advisory Committee on Antarctic Names (US-ACAN) at the suggestion of Admiral R.E. Byrd. Named for Dr. Paul Dudley White, internationally renowned specialist on heart diseases, who was a consultant on medical matters in regard to U.S. Navy Operation Highjump, 1946–47, led by Byrd.

See also 
 List of antarctic and sub-antarctic islands

External links 
 White Islands on geographic.org

Islands of the Ross Dependency
King Edward VII Land